Maria C. Tamargo is a leading Cuban-American scientist in compound semiconductors and materials science. She is a professor of chemistry at The City College of New York.

Life and education 
Maria Tamargo was born in Baton Rouge, LA in 1951 to Cuban parents. She lived in Havana, CUBA from 1952 to 1962, at which time she moved with her family to the United States and has lived there ever since.
Maria Tamargo received her first degree (B.S.) in Chemistry from the University of Puerto Rico in 1972. She moved to Johns Hopkins University where she completed an M.S. in Chemistry in 1974 followed by a Ph.D. in Chemistry in 1978.
She is married to MacRae Maxfield, also a Chemist and educator, and has two children, Nicolas and Marcela Maxfield.

Research and Career 
Maria Tamargo's research covers a wide range of compound semiconductors and she has particular expertise in molecular beam epitaxy.

After completing her Ph.D. at Johns Hopkins University she spent several years as Technical Staff at AT&T Bell Labs (1978-1984) and Bellcore (1984-1993).

In 1993 she became a Professor of Chemistry at City College of New York. She is a member of the doctoral faculty in Chemistry and Physics at the CUNY Graduate Center, and Electrical Engineering at CCNY. Between 2001 and 2007 she held the post of Dean of Science at City College of New York. She is currently the center director of the National Science Foundation (NSF) CREST Center for Interface Design and Engineered Assembly of Low Dimensional Systems (IDEALS).

She is also the author of over 300 papers in the field of semiconductor research. She holds a number of patents.

Awards and Prizes 
Tamargo was elected a fellow of the American Physical Society (APS) in 2000 for "significant original contributions to the development and understanding of the growth and properties of novel semiconductor materials and heterostructures, in particular, in the field of wide bandgap II-VI compounds."

In 2017 she received the MBE Innovator Award from the North American Conference of Molecular Beam Epitaxy for “advancing the growth of wide-bandgap II-VI semiconductors by molecular beam epitaxy and demonstrating their unique physical properties and potential novel device applications”.

She was elected a member of the National Academy of Engineering in 2020 for "forging the way toward an inclusive science and engineering research community and for contributions to molecular-beam epitaxy of semiconductor materials."

Publications
Tamargo edited a book titled "II-VI Semiconductor Materials and their Applications", which is part of the series "Optoelectronic properties of semiconductors and superlattices".

References

Living people
1951 births
City College of New York faculty
21st-century American chemists
American women chemists
21st-century American women scientists
Fellows of the American Physical Society